Marie Melchers (born 13 April 1939) is a Belgian fencer. She competed in the women's individual foil event at the 1960 Summer Olympics.

References

External links
 

1939 births
Living people
Belgian female foil fencers
Olympic fencers of Belgium
Fencers at the 1960 Summer Olympics